Gerald Ritchie Upjohn, Baron Upjohn, CBE, PC, DL (25 February 1903 – 27 January 1971) was a British soldier and judge.

Biography 
The younger son of William Henry Upjohn KC, he served in the Welsh Guards during the Second World War, reaching the rank of brigadier. In 1948, he sat with Sir George Lynskey and Sir Godfrey Vick on the Lynskey tribunal. Appointed to the Privy Council in 1960, he was Lord Justice of Appeal from 1960 to 1963. On 26 November 1963 he became a Lord of Appeal in Ordinary and was made additionally a life peer by the style title Baron Upjohn, of Little Tey in the County of Essex.

While a Lord of Appeal in Ordinary he contributed to a number of significant cases. Three cases of particular importance are Boardman v Phipps [1967] 2 AC 46 (giving a powerful dissent), Vandervell v IRC [1967] 2 AC 291 (where he gave a majority speech) and In re Gulbenkian's Settlements [1970] AC 508.

An interesting problem arose on Lord Upjohn's death. The Judicial Committee of the House of Lords would ideally sit with an odd number of judges, to ensure a clear decision. Lord Upjohn's death raised the problem of an equally divided Appellate Committee. Kennedy v Spratt [1972] AC 83 remained on the docket and Lord Upjohn had already prepared a speech, intending to vote with Lord Reid and Lord Diplock, dismissing the appeal. Lord Reid read Lord Upjohn's speech as a part of his own and in accordance with the presumption in favour of the status quo (semper pracsumitur pro negante), the appeal was dismissed. It has been pointed out that, 'had Lord Upjohn been in favour of allowing the appeal, the application of the principle
would have produced a disgruntled appellant whose victory had been snatched from under his nose: it may well be that such manifest injustice would have led to the case being reargued before a reconstituted court.'

Notable cases

As Counsel 
 Eaves v. Eaves [1939] Ch. 1000
 Re Diplock [1948] Ch. 465
 Ministry of Health v Simpson [1951] A.C. 251

As Upjohn J 
 Copeland v Greenhalf [1952] Ch 488
 Thompson (WL) Ltd v Robinson (Gunmakers) Ltd, [1955] Ch 177
 Merricks v. Heathcote Amory [1955] Ch. 567

In the Court of Appeal 
 Hong Kong Fir v Kawasaki [1962] 2 QB 26;
 In Re Pauling's Settlement Trusts [1964] Ch. 303
 Car and Universal Finance Co Ltd v Caldwell [1965] 1 QB 525
 Boulting v Association of Cinematograph, Television and Allied Technicians [1963] 2 QB 606

In the Privy Council 
 Paradise Beach and Transportation Co Ltd v Price-Robinson [1968] AC 1072

In the House of Lords 
 Practice Statement (Judicial Precedent) [1966] 1 WLR 1234
 Suisse Atlantique Societe d'Armament SA v NV Rotterdamsche Kolen Centrale [1967] 1 A.C. 361
 Boardman v Phipps [1967] 2 AC 46
 Vandervell v IRC [1967] 2 AC 291
 Beswick v Beswick [1968] AC 58
 C Czarnikow Ltd v Koufos or The Heron II [1969] 1 AC 350
 In re Gulbenkian's Settlements [1970] AC 508
 Pettitt v. Pettitt [1970] A.C. 777
 Redland Bricks Ltd. v. Morris [1970] A.C. 652
 Bushell v Faith [1970] AC 1099

Arms

References
 

1903 births
1971 deaths
Welsh Guards officers
British Army personnel of World War II
Commanders of the Order of the British Empire
Upjohn
Members of the Privy Council of the United Kingdom
Members of the Judicial Committee of the Privy Council
Knights Bachelor